Hespero Airport  is located  southwest of Hespero, Alberta, Canada.

References

External links
Page about this airport  on COPA's Places to Fly airport directory

Registered aerodromes in Alberta
Clearwater County, Alberta